Matters of the Heart may refer to:

Matters of the Heart (Tracy Chapman album), 1992
Matters of the Heart (Bob Bennett album), 1983
Matters of the Heart (Commissioned album), 1994 
Matters of the Heart (Restless Heart album), 1994
Matters of the Heart (novel), a 2009 novel by Danielle Steel
Matters of the Heart (1973 film), a Soviet drama film
Matters of the Heart (1993 film), a Ghanaian film